"Hickory Wind" is a song written by country rock artist Gram Parsons and former International Submarine Band member Bob Buchanan. The song was written on a train ride the pair took from Florida to Los Angeles in early 1968, and first appeared on The Byrds' Sweetheart of the Rodeo album. Despite Buchanan's input, "Hickory Wind" is generally considered to be Parsons' signature song. Parsons' decision to play "Hickory Wind" instead of the planned Merle Haggard cover "Life in Prison" during The Byrds' performance at the Grand Ole Opry on March 15, 1968 "pissed off the country music establishment" and stunned Opry regulars to such an extent that the song is now considered essential to Parsons' legend.

Johnny Rogan, in his book The Byrds: Timeless Flight Revisited, offers the following interpretation for the song: "The alluring 'Hickory Wind' serves as a powerful image for Parsons' bittersweet nostalgia, as he imagines an Edenic childhood of simple pleasures like climbing trees. During successive verses, he reflects on the pursuit of fame, the curse of wealth without spiritual satisfaction, and the perils of city life. What really makes the song, however, is Parsons' aching vocal performance, set against a superb steel guitar backing, whose whining combines with his yearning voice to create a mood of unbearable poignancy." Chris Hillman, Parsons' partner in The Byrds and later The Flying Burrito Brothers, offers the following interpretation of the song: 
It's his [Parsons'] signature song, just as 'I'll Feel a Whole Lot Better' is Gene Clark's signature song. If Gram had never written another song, "Hickory Wind" would have put him on the map. The song says it all – it's very descriptive, with vivid imagery. It's actually quite literary, but Gram was, we know, was a very bright kid. If you know the guy's life story, however he conjured up that scenario – it's right at home. Gram was shuffled off to a prep school, lots of money... that's a lonely song. He was a lonely kid.

Parsons first recorded "Hickory Wind" with The Byrds on March 9, 1968, at Columbia Records' Nashville recording studios during sessions for the Sweetheart of the Rodeo album. The song features the noted session musicians Lloyd Green on pedal steel guitar and John Hartford on fiddle. In addition, Parsons plays acoustic guitar and piano, with bass, banjo and drums being played by Chris Hillman, Roger McGuinn and Kevin Kelley respectively. Although the song is often regarded as one of the best of Parsons' career, it was not released as a single. The song was re-recorded for Parsons' 1974 album, Grievous Angel, as part of the "Medley Live from Northern Quebec", along with the song "Cash on the Barrelhead".

Authorship controversy
In 2002, an article on the website www.folklinks.com controversially claimed that "Hickory Wind" was not written by Gram Parsons, but by Sylvia Sammons—a blind folksinger from Greenville, South Carolina—with Bob Buchanan later contributing an additional verse. Sammons' alleged authorship of the song was first made public by traditional musician Kay Justice during a performance at a small church concert in southwest Virginia. Additionally, L. Beatrice Hutzler, a former professor at Clinch Valley College (now the University of Virginia's College at Wise), recalled that she too had heard Sammons sing the song in person prior to its being recorded by The Byrds.

When interviewed in 2002, Sammons claimed that she had written the song and that she regularly performed "Hickory Wind" at coffeehouses and other folk venues in Greenville during 1963—a time when Parsons was also performing in Greenville with his band The Shilos—and that her song was stolen during this period. She further claims that in 1969 she reached a cash settlement with a music publisher for the rights to "Hickory Wind" and agreed to turn over a tape-recorded copy of the song, which was her only physical proof of authorship.

Sammons' claim to the song has been rebutted by both Bob Buchanan and Chris Hillman, with the latter stating "As far as I know Gram and Bob Buchanan did indeed write 'Hickory Wind'. As unstable as Gram was in my brief time with him on this earth, I sincerely doubt he was a plagiarist in any of his songwriting endeavors unless his co-writer Bob brought him the idea." Although many people have chosen to dismiss Sammons' claim, citing a lack of any physical proof on her part, the controversy surrounding the authorship of "Hickory Wind" remains.

Calling her claim further into doubt, it appears that in a 1993 Orlando Sentinel article, a woman with the same name, Sylvia Sammons, stated she was a blind, 42 year old folk singer from a small town in North Carolina, who had been performing "for 12 years on the coffeehouse circuit," or since 1981; this would have made her aged 12–13, living in a different state, and nearly 20 years away from her first performance on "the coffeehouse circuit" at the time she later claimed to have written the song.

Covers
"Hickory Wind" was covered by Joan Baez on her 1969 release, David's Album. Parsons' friend and one-time musical partner Emmylou Harris also covered it on her 1979 album Blue Kentucky Girl. Richard Thompson, Clive Gregson, and Christine Collister also recorded a cover of the song for the 1989 Byrds' tribute album, Time Between – A Tribute to The Byrds. Grant Lee Phillips recorded his cover version for his Virginia Creeper album. The Seldom Scene covered "Hickory Wind" on the live album Blue Grass: The Greatest Show On Earth recorded at a concert in 1980 and released in 1986 with members of The Country Gentlemen and J. D. Crowe and the New South. Ryan Adams & the Cardinals covered the song numerous times in concert. Lucinda Williams has covered the song twice: once on Cayamo: Sessions at Sea, an album by Buddy Miller, and again on a tribute album to Harris entitled: The Life & Songs of Emmylou Harris.  BR5-49 recorded the song on their 1996 self-titled album.

References

1968 songs
The Byrds songs
Gram Parsons songs
Joan Baez songs
Song recordings produced by Gary Usher